Toi market was an open-air market located on the outskirts of Kibera slum, Nairobi, Kenya. The market sat on a three-acre plot on Suna Road, a by-street to Ngong Road which runs almost the length of Nairobi, from the Lang'ata area into the center of the city.

Before it was razed by marauding gangs during post-election violence in early 2008, Toi was one of the largest informal markets in Nairobi, with over 5000 traders. It mainly sells clothes, but also vegetables and other small accessories.

In April 2018, the Nairobi County government announced that it would demolish the market and construct modern houses on the land. The market would be moved elsewhere, although the announcement did not specify where. The market was demolished a month later, with demolitions going on until July 2018.

References

External links
Commission on Legal Empowerment of the Poor: Photo story of the Toi Market in Kenya
http://www.eastandard.net/archives/cl/hm_news/news_s.php?articleid=1143961740

Buildings and structures in Nairobi